Euphaedra cottoni is a butterfly in the family Nymphalidae. It is found in Cameroon and the eastern part of the Democratic Republic of the Congo.

Similar species
Other members of the Euphaedra ceres species group q.v.

References

Butterflies described in 1907
cottoni